Paul Louis Auguste Warnier de Wailly (May 16, 1854  June 18, 1933) was a French composer.

Life 
Paul de Wailly grew up in Château de Bagatelle in Abbeville. He lost his father, a naval officer, when he was seven. He started composing at the age of 17 and became a student of César Franck at the Paris Conservatoire. In 1900, he married Marthe de Maricourt (1870-1918).

At the beginning of the 20th century, de Wailly held regular concerts at Château de Bagatelle. During the First World War, he took over the administration of the Abbeville Hospital. In 1921, along with Albert Laurent (1885-1978), he founded the "Society of Friends of Music" in Abbeville to present lectures and organize concerts.

De Wailly created orchestral works (including several symphonies), chamber music (including a piano quintet in F minor, op. 15 from 1895), organ works, and vocal compositions. The majority of his compositions display characteristics of the late romantic tradition of César Franck. Firmly devoted to absolute music in the classical style, he opposed contemporary trends at the beginning of the 20th century. However, he still maintained friendships with modern composers, including Erik Satie, who he supported for a time.

Most of de Wailly's works were composed between 1870-1900 and published in Paris between 1892 and 1930. However, on the eve of the World War I, his oratorio, L'Apôtre (The Apostle), was performed at the Théâtre des Champs-Elysees on December 19, 23 and 28, 1924, but public reception was lukewarm. With the exception of performances at the Société Nationale de Musique (National Music Society), de Wailly's music did not achieve great success outside appreciation outside a small circle of friends. However, he received a favorable review stating that he was "heavily applauded" at a performance of two chansons with orchestra in 1911.

Additionally, the Aubade for flute, oboe, and clarinet was given a positive reception when it was premiered by the Société moderne d'instruments à vent in Paris on March 7, 1902, with noted flutist Georges Barrère.

De Wailly died in 1933.

Selected works

Instrumental  
 Cello Sonata in D major (ca. 1879)
 Chanson (1878), possibly including Toujours, Chanson, and Li-taï-pé.
 Serenade for Flute and Strings, Op.25 (ca. 1887)
 Piano Quintet in F minor, op. 15 (1895)
 Aubade (1901, published 1906), for flute, oboe, and clarinet
 6 Pieces for Two Violins and Cello (ca. 1919)
 Wind Octet in E-flat major, Op. 22 (ca.1929) for flute, oboe, 2 clarinets, trumpet in C, horn, 2 bassoons
 Sous un balcon, serenade for chamber orchestra

For voice  
 Trois mélodies pour une voix avec accompagnement de piano, Op. 5 (1878)
 Toujours
 Chanson
 Li-taï-pé

 Deux mélodies avec orchestre
 Au Vaisseau 
 Sous un berceau de clématite

For solo piano
 Prélude 
 Tribute
 Mazurka 
 Au bord de la mer 
 Vieux souvenirs 
 Capriceio 
 In Hongrie (I et II) 
 Incertitude

Other works 
 L'Apôtre (The Apostle), (1924)
 Hilas, idylle antique, parole de Jean Lorrain
 Cantiques et chants divers en l'honneur de Saint Gilles (1896)

References

Further reading 
 Paul Frank, Wilhelm Altmann: Kurzgefasstes Tonkünstler Lexikon. Gustav Bosse, Regensburg 1936, .
 Guido M. Gatti: La musica. Parte seconda: dizionario. Editrice Torinese, Turin 1968–71.
 Alain Le Tribroche: La vie musicale à Abbeville et à Amiens au XIXe siècle. Centre Régional de Documentation Pédagogique de Picardie, Amiens 1993.

1854 births
1933 deaths
People from Abbeville
19th-century French composers
20th-century French composers